The Boy and the Pirates is a 1960 American adventure film directed by Bert I. Gordon, known as a master of giant monster films. It stars a popular child star Charles Herbert and Gordon's daughter Susan. The storyline concerns a boy and girl trapped on Blackbeard's pirate ship.

Plot 
A boy named Jimmy Warren who lives along the Massachusetts coast is upset with the unfairness of modern life when his father scolds him about his school grades. He plays on a wrecked ship along the shore with a girl named Kathy. He picks up an odd brass jar and wishes to be back in the olden days on a pirate ship. When Jimmy utters "Where am I?," the magic jar pops open and a strange little man appears. He introduces himself as Abu the Genie and states that he has granted Jimmy his wish to be on a real pirate ship. Jimmy scoffs at the notion, but Abu insists that they are at that very moment passengers on Queen Anne's Revenge, the pirate ship of the notorious Blackbeard.

Abu refuses to grant Jimmy's wish to go home, and informs him that he must return the brass bottle to the exact spot where he found it within three days or he will be forced to take the genie's place inside of it. The genie then tries to ensure that Jimmy will fail to do so. Chased by Blackbeard, at the last second Jimmy returns the bottle to the place he found it, and he finds himself returned to the present day. He remembers his adventure but Kathy is puzzled about his story.

Cast
 Charles Herbert as Jimmy Warren
 Susan Gordon as Katrina Van Keif / Kathy
 Murvyn Vye as Blackbeard
 Paul Guilfoyle as Snipe
 Joe Turkel (as Joseph) as Abu the Genie
 Archie Duncan as Scoggins
 Than Wyenn as Hunter
 Albert Cavens as Dutch Captain
 Mickey Finn as Peake
 Morgan Jones as Mr. Warren
 Timothy Carey as Pirate Morgan

Production
Charles Herbert recalled: "Timothy Carey on this movie probably scared me more than The Colossus of New York! But he was a nice man, and he always tried to make you feel, 'I’m not really crazy,' and you would say, 'Okay.' And then he would walk away and you’d go, 'He’s CRAZY!' He was a scary man. He’d look at me and I would run behind my mother. And I had to catch up to her, because she was tryin’ to find somebody else to hide behind!"

Reception 
In a brief contemporary review in The New York Times, critic Howard Thompson called The Boy and the Pirates "... a standard, rather cloying little item ... it's all pretty sticky, albeit clean. The kids deserve better."

Home media
The Walt Disney Company's 2006 theatrical release of Johnny Depp's Pirates of the Caribbean: Dead Man's Chest revived interest in pirate films. To take advantage of this, Sony Pictures Home Entertainment released a Midnite Movies double feature DVD set with the rarely seen The Boy and the Pirates and the more recent Crystalstone (1987) on June 27, 2006.

Comic book adaption
 Dell Four Color #1117 (June 1960)

See also
 List of American films of 1960

References

External links
 

1960 films
1960 adventure films
American children's adventure films
American fantasy adventure films
Films set in the 1710s
Films set in Massachusetts
Pirate films
Films about time travel
United Artists films
Films adapted into comics
Cultural depictions of Blackbeard
Films directed by Bert I. Gordon
Films scored by Albert Glasser
1960s English-language films
1960s American films